Víctor Limba (born 6 October 1947) is a former Argentine cyclist. He competed in the sprint event at the 1972 Summer Olympics.

References

External links
 

1947 births
Living people
Argentine male cyclists
Olympic cyclists of Argentina
Cyclists at the 1972 Summer Olympics
Place of birth missing (living people)
Pan American Games medalists in cycling
Pan American Games bronze medalists for Argentina
Cyclists at the 1971 Pan American Games
20th-century Argentine people
21st-century Argentine people